The Forest Festival or Festival of the Forests is a music festival created by Bruno Ory-Lavollée in 1992 held every year in June and July in Compiegne, northern France.

Four world premieres have been presented at the Festival e.g. Winter's Night by Nicolas Bacri, who was composer in residence at the  Forest Festival 2010-2012.

Following an open letter on 12 June from Korean expatriates in France to, among others, French Minister of Culture Aurélie Filippetti and the president of the Forest Festival, and subsequent talks between the festival and the Ministry of Culture, French Foreign Minister Laurent Fabius on 30 June gave written notice to the festival suggesting the projection should be renounced "out of sensitivity and respect for the Korean people mourning [following the sinking of Sewol], in particular the families of the young victims, and in the interest of the Festival and of France"; the projection and the sponsorship was cancelled on 2 July.

References

External links
  

Music festivals in France
Music festivals established in 1992
Classical music festivals in France